This is a list of practical joke topics (also known as a prank, gag, jape or shenanigan) which are mischievous tricks or jokes played on someone, typically causing the victim to experience embarrassment, perplexity, confusion, or discomfort. 

Practical jokes differ from confidence tricks or hoaxes in that the victim finds out, or is let in on the joke, rather than being fooled into handing over money or other valuables. Practical jokes or pranks are generally lighthearted, reversible and non-permanent, and aim to make the victim feel foolish or victimised to a degree, but may also involve cruelty and become a form of bullying if performed without appropriate finesse.

Practical jokes

0–9
 2004 Harvard–Yale prank

A

 Alhokm Baad Almozawla
 April Fools' Day
 List of April Fools' Day jokes

B

 Berners Street hoax
 Bingo Shooting Device
 Black fax

C
 Caltech–MIT rivalry
 Candid Camera
 Capping stunt
 Josiah S. Carberry
 Chewing gum bug
 Chinese finger trap
 Chinese fire drill
 Confetti eggs/cascerones
 Culture jamming

D
 Devil's Night
 Devious licks
 Dribble glass
 Dutch oven

E

 Egging
 Elbow grease
 Email spoofing
 Exploding cigar

F
 Fake denominations of United States currency
 Fake vomit
 Father Pat Noise
 Flagging

G

 Gag name
 Glitter bombing
 Googly eyes
 Golden rivet
 Great Rose Bowl Hoax
 Great Stork Derby
 Groucho glasses

H

 Hacks at the Massachusetts Institute of Technology
 Harisen
 Henryk Batuta hoax
 Hot foot

I
 Indian burn
 Itching powder

J

 Joy buzzer

K
 Kancho
 Kick me -note
 Knock, Knock, Ginger

L

 Lace card
 Latex mask
 List of frivolous political parties
 List of Google April Fools' Day jokes
 List of Google Easter eggs

M
 Milkshaking
 Mischief Night
 Mooning
 Muck-up day

N

 No soap radio
 Non-human electoral candidates
 Noogie

P

 Pantsing
 Panty raid
 Penny under the sink 
 Phoenix Five (prank)
 Pieing
 List of people who have been pied
 Pigasus (politics)
 Plate lifter
 Practical joke device
 Prank call
 Pranknet
 Punk'd
 Pythagorean cup

Q
 ¡Qué Locura!

R
 Rickrolling
 Rutgers–Princeton Cannon War

S

 Saluting trap
 Senior prank
 Shaft passer
 Shanghai Fugu Agreement
 Shocking gum
 Shoe-lacing
 Skyhook (cable)
 Snake nut can
 Sneezing powder
 Snipe hunt
Spaghetti Tree Hoax
 Spit ball shooting
 Stink bomb
 Student prank
 Streaking
 Swirly

T
 Taro Tsujimoto hoax
 The Jerky Boys
 Toilet papering
 Towel snap
 Travelling gnome prank
 Trick candles
 Tube Bar prank calls
 Tickling

U
 Kazuo Uzuki

V

 Valentine Phantom

W

 Wedgie
 Wet willy
 Who Gets the Last Laugh? (TV series)
 Whoopee cushion
 Windy City Heat

X
 X-ray specs

See also

 Hoax
 List of slapstick comedy topics
 Novelty item
 Pun
 Slapstick
 Surreal humour
 Visual gag

References

list
Entertainment lists
Humor-related lists
Practical jokes
Jokes